The 2000 West Coast Conference Baseball Championship Series was held on May 19 and 20, 2000 at Loyola Marymount's home stadium, George C. Page Stadium in Los Angeles, California, and pitted the winners of the conference's two four-team divisions.

Seeding

Results
Game One

Game Two

References

West Coast Conference Baseball Championship
Tournament
Baseball in Los Angeles
West Coast Conference Baseball Championship Series
West Coast Conference Baseball Championship Series